Haugh is a hamlet and civil parish in the East Lindsey district of Lincolnshire, England.

Haugh is listed in the 1086 Domesday Book, with 37 households.

The parish church is dedicated to Saint Leonard and is a Grade I listed building dating from the 11th century, with later additions, and a restoration in 1873. It is built of chalk and greenstone with red-brick patching. The blocked north door is late 12th-century, with both the font and the south door 14th-century. On the
south wall there is an alabaster wall plaque to Sir Charles Bolle, who died in 1690, and on the north wall a large wall monument to Sir John Bolle, who died in 1606.

Manor Farmhouse is a red-brick Grade II listed country house and former seat of the Bolle family, now a farmhouse dating from the mid-16th century with later additions.

References

External links

Villages in Lincolnshire
Civil parishes in Lincolnshire
East Lindsey District